The painted comber (Serranus scriba) is a species of marine ray-finned fish, a sea bass from the subfamily Serraninae, classified as part of the family Serranidae which includes the groupers and anthias. It is found in the eastern Atlantic Ocean, the Mediterranean Sea, and the Black Sea. Confusingly, a synonym of this species is Perca marina, but that name (as Sebastes marinus) has incorrectly been used for a separate species, the rose fish.

Description
The painted comber has a laterally compressed, elongate body with a pointed snout. The dorsal fin has 10 spines and 4-16 soft rays and the anal fin has 3 spines and 7-8 soft rays. The caudal fin is truncate. It has a very large mouth for its size, which has many sharp teeth, and is protractile. The overall colour may be grey, purplish or reddish with 5-7 dark brown bars on the flanks. The head is marked with many narrow, wavy blue lines and red blotches. The dorsal, anal and caudal fins are marked with red dots. There is a diffuse, purplish-blue blotch in the middle of the body. The pelvic and pectoral fins are normally uniform pale yellow.

Distribution
The painted comber is found in the eastern Atlantic Ocean where its core range extends from the Straits of Gibraltar to Senegal, including the Canary Islands but it occurs as far north as the Bay of Biscay. Its range extends into the Mediterranean and Black Seas.

Habitat and biology
It normally spends the day sheltering in rocky caves and is normally either solitary or found in small groups. It emerges at dusk to hunt. It is a carnivorous species which is a territorial ambush hunter and has a diet made up of cephalopods, bivalves, crustaceans, fishes, and worms. It is often used to indicate sites occupied by octopuses as it waits at the entrance scavenging the octopus's discarded parts of shellfish. The spawning season runs from late spring to early summer with the eggs being laid under stones near the shore. It is a synchronous hermaphrodite, i.e. each individual has both male and female gonads and may be capable of self-fertilisation. They have a maximum life expectancy of 16 years.

Parasites 
The painted comber, like most fishes, is host to a variety of internal and external parasites and these include the copepods Lernanthropus scribae, Caligus scribae and Anchistrotos laqueus; an isopod Gnathia sp.; a monogenean Protolamellodiscus serranelli; and two species of digeneans Helicometra fasciata and Lecithochirium musculus.

Taxonomy
The painted comber was first formally described by Linnaeus in the 10th Edition of his Systema Naturae published in 1758 as Perca scriba.

Human use
The painted comber is landed by artisanal fisheries using hook and line and trawls. It is said to have palatable flesh and can be prepared using a variety of cooking methods.

References

External links
 

painted comber
Fauna of Macaronesia
Marine fauna of North Africa
Fish of the Mediterranean Sea
Fish of the Black Sea
painted comber
painted comber